Gunnar Berg may refer to:

 Gunnar Berg (composer) (1909–1989), Swiss-born Danish composer
 Gunnar Berg (Scouting) (1896–1987), national director of the Boy Scouts of America
 Gunnar Berg (painter) (1863–1893), Norwegian painter
 Gunnar Berg (politician) (1923–2007), Norwegian politician for the Liberal Party
 Gunnar Andreas Berg (born 1954), Norwegian musician and record label owner

See also
 Gunner Berg (1764–1827), Norwegian priest, writer and politician
 Gunnar Berge (born 1940), Norwegian politician, Labour Party